Vildhjarta is a Swedish progressive metal band from Hudiksvall, formed in 2005. The band plays in a Meshuggah-influenced musical style employing heavily down-tuned guitars, as well as harmonic minor chord progressions, jarring staccato riffs, layers of reverberant guitars and atmospheres.

The group released a two-track EP entitled Omnislash in 2009 before they proceeded to sign with Century Media Records in 2011, spawning their debut full-length album Måsstaden that same year. In 2013, they followed up with a second EP, Thousands of Evils released on an exclusive 1,000-copy vinyl record run. Their second full-length album Måsstaden under vatten was released in October of 2021.

The word "vildhjärta" translates to "wildheart" in Swedish. The band's name was inspired by the name of an adventure module for the Swedish tabletop role-playing game Drakar och Demoner.

History 
Vildhjarta was founded initially as an idea by Daniel Bergström, Jimmie Åkerström, and Johan Nyberg in 2005 in Hudiksvall, Sweden. The band's earliest days consisted of three members (all spread throughout different parts of Sweden).

According to Vildhjarta guitarist Daniel Bergström, commitment to their fans and "the art of music itself", only allowed for three songs to be released in the four years before the release of their first full-length album. After acquiring additional members and years of trading e-mails with metal label giant Century Media they signed a worldwide record contract in the Spring of 2011. Their debut album, Måsstaden, is a concept-album that "tells the tale of a hidden and isolated town, narrated in a classic fable manner". Sources of inspiration for the album's story included The Jungle Book and Mumindalen. The album received a favourable review from Consequence of Sound, who called it "a harsh, fantastic, concept work." 2011 also saw a major line-up change in the band: Vilhelm Bladin replaced Robert Luciani who parted ways and formed the band Means End together with former Uneven Structure drummer Christian Schreil.

On 20 April 2012 third guitarist Jimmie Åkerström left the band, which effectively reverted the lineup back to their initial two-guitarist setup. Fans were reassured that his resigning would not affect the group's writing or touring plans. In May they embarked on a European tour with Veil of Maya, Volumes, and Structures.

In late 2012, the band announced that they were planning to release an EP of new material, entitled Thousands of Evils. 3 clips from the EP were released and a new song was debuted live on the "Euroblast Tour" in late 2012. The EP was released as a limited edition vinyl. After the release of Thousands of Evils, the band became relatively silent about any future endeavors. It wasn't until late 2016 that Vildhjarta unveiled a minute-long teaser for new music. In 2018, the band also confirmed that they would be performing an exclusive show for the 2018 Euroblast festival.

Calle Thomér launched a solo project called "stoort neer", releasing an instrumental album en glad titel på en sorglig skiva on 19 September 2018. The album includes guest contributions from fellow Vildhjarta members. He has also been a guitarist in Humanity's Last Breath since 2016, of which Buster Odeholm is a founding member.

In November 2019, the group released "Den Helige Anden", which would be the first single of the then-tentatively titled second album Kaos2 with an estimated release date of 2020. However, it wasn't until April 2021 before further details would be announced, along with the release of a new single "När de du älskar kommer tillbaka från de döda" from an album now titled Måsstaden under vatten. It is the first release to feature drummer Buster Odeholm, who additionally mixed, mastered and produced the album. On 20 August 2021, two new songs titled "Toxin" and "Kaos2" were released along with the album art, tracklist and the release date of the album, which has been confirmed as 15 October 2021. On 17 September 2021, the last single from the album, "Penny Royal Poison", was released. In January 2022 Vildhjarta released the remixed and remastered versions of Måsstaden and Thousands of Evils, entitled Måsstaden (forte) and Thousands of Evils (forte)  with remixing and remastering being done by Buster Odeholm.

Influences and meaning of "thall" 
Guitarist Calle Thomér cited the bands Meshuggah, Ion Dissonance, Katatonia and The Mars Volta as some of the group's most prominent influences.

With their distinct take on djent, Vildhjarta inadvertently coined the accompanying word thall, which the group have used to describe their own music and it as well has become a meme among the band and its fans. The etymology of thall originates from the slurred pronunciation of the World of Warcraft character Thrall when pronounced with a Swedish accent. The word has since become closely trademarked and synonymous with the band aesthetically, but more recently Vildhjarta has explained that the context of the word is rather vague and has no real explicit meaning; "It can be whatever you want it to be."

Members 

Current 
 Daniel Bergström – guitar (2005–present)
 Calle Thomér – guitar (2009–present)
 Vilhelm Bladin – vocals (2011–present)
 Buster Odeholm – drums (2014–present), bass (2020–present)

Former
 Robert Luciani – vocals (2008–2011)
 Jimmie Åkerström – guitar (2005–2012)
 David Lindkvist – drums (2008–2014)
 Daniel Ädel – vocals (2008–2016)
 Johan Nyberg – bass (2005–2015)

Timeline

Discography 
Studio albums
Måsstaden (2011)
Måsstaden under vatten (2021)

EPs
 Omnislash (2009)
 Thousands of Evils (2013)

References 

Swedish progressive metal musical groups
People from Hudiksvall Municipality
2005 establishments in Sweden
Musical groups established in 2005
Century Media Records artists
Post-metal musical groups